Opposite Sex is an American comedy-drama series that aired during Fox's summer 2000 schedule. The series was one of the first teen dramas to primarily use independent artists on its soundtrack by such acts as Elliott Smith and Ben Lee.

The series was initially shot in 1999 for the 1999–2000 season, but its broadcast was delayed to the summer of 2000. The series lasted eight episodes before being canceled.

Synopsis
The series chronicles the life of Jed Perry (Milo Ventimiglia), a 15-year-old boy who moves to Northern California along with his father shortly after the death of his mother. After enrolling at the prestigious Evergreen Academy, Jed finds out the school was formerly for girls, and recently became co-ed. Along with Jed, only two other boys attend the school, Philip Steffan (Kyle Howard) and Cary Baston (Chris Evans). The boys run into problems when the girls of the school are resistant to the changes and make it clear that their presence is unwanted.

Cast
Milo Ventimiglia as Jed Perry
Kyle Howard as Philip Steffan
Chris Evans as Cary Baston
Margot Finley as Miranda Mills
Lindsey McKeon as Stella
Allison Mack as Kate Jacobs
Garcelle Beauvais as Ms. Maya Bradley
Rena Sofer as Ms. Gibson
Chris McKenna as Rob Perry
Christopher Cousins as Mr. Will Perry
Alexandra Breckenridge as Francise

Reception
Carole Horst of Variety wrote of the series, "Clever concept, sleek production values, a nice cast and thoughtful writing (for a teen show) add up to the enjoyable Opposite Sex". Horst added, "Despite all the good things in this gentle comedy drama, it's hard to say who the series is aimed at: It's not intellectual enough for "Freaks" fans and too grounded for the WB crowd. Young auds will have to seek it out. And therein lies the rub." Steve Johnson of the Chicago Tribune said the premise of the show is interesting but its "humor and sensibility" falls flat. Barry Garron of The Hollywood Reporter described Opposite Sex as a "far-fetched, overly earnest teen-oriented show" that "never manages to overcome its contrived premise and establish real emotional connections." He went on to say that "My So-Called Life and Freaks & Geeks have raised the bar for teen drama by providing keen insight into the awkwardness of adolescence" and that while not on the same level this series is "not nearly as cartoonish" as Saved by the Bell. Joel Brown, a New York Times syndicated columnist published in The Spokesman-Review found that "Ventimiglia conveys Jed's frustration well" but that "bad TV cliches overwhelm this show's mild promise." The Modesto Bee's TV critic, Kevin McDonough, describes the series as "hardly the worst teen show of the year" and stated that "it lacks the soft-core exploitation that permeates Young Americans." David Bianculli of the New York Daily News gave a positive review, writing, "Abby Kohn and Marc Silverstein, creators and co-executive producers of 'Opposite Sex,' are as aware of the subtle and often painful interplays and power plays of high-school life as were the makers of, say, 'My So-Called Life'".

Episodes

References

External links
 
 

2000s American comedy-drama television series
2000s American high school television series
2000s American teen drama television series
2000 American television series debuts
2000 American television series endings
English-language television shows
Fox Broadcasting Company original programming
Television series about teenagers
Television series by Warner Bros. Television Studios
Television shows set in San Francisco
Coming-of-age television shows